Democratic Youth Front (in Spanish: Frente de Juventudes Democráticas), was a political group in Peru that surged in 1956. It launched Fernando Belaúnde Terry as its presidential candidate the same year. FJD was the base of the foundation of Popular Action.

Defunct political parties in Peru
Political parties established in 1956
Political parties with year of disestablishment missing